The 2009 Allianz Suisse Open Gstaad was a tennis tournament played on outdoor red clay courts. It was the 42nd edition of the event known that year as the Allianz Suisse Open Gstaad and was part of the ATP World Tour 250 series of the 2009 ATP World Tour. It took place at the Roy Emerson Arena in Gstaad, Switzerland, from 26 July through 2 August 2009.

ATP entrants

Seeds

 as of July 20, 2009

Other entrants
The following players received wildcards into the singles main draw

  Gastón Gaudio
  Stéphane Bohli
  Marco Chiudinelli

The following players received entry from the qualifying draw:
  Thomaz Bellucci
  Federico del Bonis
  Farrukh Dustov
  Thierry Ascione

Finals

Singles

 Thomaz Bellucci defeated  Andreas Beck, 6–4, 7–6(7–2)
It was Bellucci's first career title.

Doubles

 Marco Chiudinelli /  Michael Lammer defeated  Jaroslav Levinský /  Filip Polášek, 7–5, 6–3.

Notes

 Players' rankings, as of Monday, July 20, 2009.
 Projected seeding based on the Monday, July 20, 2009 rankings.

References

External links
 Official website

 
Allianz Suisse Open Gstaad
2009
Allianz Suisse Open Gstaad